Trude Möhwaldová (born 25 March 1915, date of death unknown) was a Czech alpine skier. She competed in the women's combined event at the 1936 Winter Olympics.

References

External links
 

1915 births
Year of death missing
Czech female alpine skiers
Olympic alpine skiers of Czechoslovakia
Alpine skiers at the 1936 Winter Olympics
Place of birth missing